Leonid Krasnov (born 24 January 1988) is a Russian former professional racing cyclist.

Major results
2012
1st Stage 5 Grand Prix of Sochi
1st Stage 3 Tour of China II
1st Stage 1 Tour of Hainan
2nd Jurmala Grand Prix
2013
1st Stage 1a Tour of Estonia
2nd Grand Prix of Moscow
2014
1st Grand Prix of Moscow

References

External links
 

1988 births
Living people
Russian male cyclists
Cyclists from Saint Petersburg